George Abbott (born 1952) is a former politician and cabinet minister for the Canadian province of British Columbia. Abbott was a BC Liberal Party Member of the Legislative Assembly of British Columbia representing the riding of Shuswap from 1996 to 2013. He served as a cabinet minister under premiers Gordon Campbell and Christy Clark.

Politics

Campbell ministry 
George Abbott was appointed Minister of Community, Aboriginal and Women’s Services on June 5, 2001. As minister, Abbott worked with UBCM to pass the Community Charter. He was later awarded a lifetime membership in UBCM for his work on the file.

Abbot became Minister of Sustainable Resource Management on January 26, 2004. In this role, he worked with industry, environmental, and First Nations groups to complete the Great Bear Rainforest agreement which included a move to ecosystem-based management. As a result of his work on this file, Abbott was the only BC Liberal Candidate endorsed by the Conservation Voters of BC in the 2005 election.

After the 2005 election, Abbot was appointed Minister of Health. He partnered with the BC Medical Association to introduce Electronic Health Records to BC. Abbott enshrined the five principles of the Canada Health Act, plus a sixth – the principle of sustainability – in provincial law. Abbott also pushed for innovation in the health system and introduced the $100-million Health Innovation Fund, which funded pilot projects to reduce wait times in emergency rooms and for elective surgeries.

On June 10, 2009, he became Minister of as Aboriginal Relations and Reconciliation and government deputy house leader. As minister, Abbott worked with First Nations leaders to designate the Salish Sea and Haida Gwaii and signed a final agreement with the Yale First Nation. He served in these roles until October 25, 2010.

Campaign for Liberal leadership 

On November 25, 2010, George Abbott announced he was running for the leadership of the BC Liberal Party to succeed Gordon Campbell. During the campaign he stated he "would as premier move the referendum on the controversial tax to no later than June 24, 2011 rather than the September 24 date currently in place" and increase the minimum wage.  He called for a review or the $6 million payment made for expenses incurred by convicted Liberal aides Robert Virk and David Basi in association with the BC Rail trial, however, he refused to call for a full public inquiry in the alleged scandal involving allegations of bribes to Liberal party insiders. He placed third in the leadership election, which was won by Christy Clark.

Christy Clark ministry 
On March 14, 2011, Abbott was appointed minister of education, as a part of Clark's initial cabinet.

On August 30, 2012, Abbott announced he would not be running in the 2013 election. He remained education minister until September 5, 2012.

Post-politics 
In 2013, Abbott re-enrolled at the University of Victoria, where he began writing a thesis on the impact of the federal–provincial division of powers on aboriginal policy. On November 22, 2013, it was announced that Abbott would teach a course on BC's political economy at the UVic.

In 2015, Premier Clark and her cabinet vetoed the appointment of Abbott to be Chief Treaty Commissioner of BC Treaty Commission due to her government aiming to reform the treaty process. Abbott had been working on transition with the departing commission chief and his removal was criticized by First Nations. In 2015, Abbott revealed that he had let his party membership lapse and considered himself non-partisan. He stressed that it was not a decision made by any "single thing", but several factors that lead him to be unhappy with the party.

Personal life 
Abbott received his Bachelor of Arts from the University of British Columbia and his Master of Arts and Doctor of Philosophy in political science from the University of Victoria.

Abbott was the chair of the Columbia-Shuswap Regional District. He was also involved in amateur sports as a minor hockey coach.
George and Lesley Abbott live in Sicamous and have three children.

Election results (partial)

References

External links 
Official Biography, Legislative Assembly of British Columbia

1952 births
Living people
British Columbia Liberal Party MLAs
Canadian people of English descent
Education ministers of British Columbia
Health ministers of British Columbia
Members of the Executive Council of British Columbia
People from the Columbia-Shuswap Regional District
University of British Columbia alumni
University of Victoria alumni
21st-century Canadian politicians